Sparrowhawk Hill lies in the centre of Little Cayman, one of the Cayman Islands, a British Overseas Territory in the Caribbean Sea. It is one of the territory's Important Bird Areas (IBAs).

Description
Sparrowhawk Hill is a 255 ha tract of pristine native dry forest with a maximum elevation of 20 m above sea level. Dominant tree species are Calyptranthes pallens, Canella winterana, Chionanthus caymanensis, Dipholis salicifolia and Erythroxylum areolatum.

Birds
The IBA was identified as such by BirdLife International because it supports significant populations of white-crowned pigeons, Caribbean elaenias and vitelline warblers.

References

Important Bird Areas of the Cayman Islands
Little Cayman
Tropical and subtropical dry broadleaf forests